Jean V. Hardisty (June 18, 1945 – March 16, 2015) was a political scientist and lesbian radical feminist activist who became a national resource for human rights movements seeking social and economic justice and an end to bigotry based on race, gender, or class. She was a senior scholar with the Wellesley Centers for Women.

Biography
Hardisty received her PhD from Northwestern University in Illinois, taught briefly and, in the 1980s, left academia to conduct a study of the anti-feminist women's movement for the American Civil Liberties Union of Illinois. She predicted a massive organized right-wing backlash which saw the rise of the New Right and the election of Ronald Reagan as President in 1980.

She then founded the think tank which became Political Research Associates in Massachusetts to study right-wing movements nationwide. She worked as an adviser to the legal team that overturned Colorado Amendment 43. Her study "Constructing Homophobia" was included in her book Mobilizing Resentment: Conservative Resurgence from the John Birch Society to the Promise Keepers, .

She served on the boards of the  Ms. Foundation for Women, the Sister Fund, the Highlander Research and Education Center, the Center for Community Change, and the Women's Community Cancer Project. She was an education consultant to the Ms. Foundation Democracy Funding Circle. Hardisty served for many years on the board of the Civil Liberties Union of Massachusetts.

She received a Lifetime Achievement Award from the Center for Community Change and has been inducted into The City of Chicago Gay and Lesbian Hall of Fame.

Articles by Hardisty have appeared in The Nation magazine, The Women's Review of Books, The Public Eye, and other publications.

A video interview with Hardisty is at the Chicago Gay History website.

Selected publications

References

Further reading

External links
 Wellesley Centers for Women
 The Nation Magazine
 Political Research Associates 
 Religion Dispatches
 Chicago Gay History
 Astraea Foundation
 Jean Hardisty Website
Papers of Jean V. Hardisty, 1954-2015 (inclusive), 1976-2008 (bulk): A Finding Aid. Schlesinger Library, Radcliffe Institute, Harvard University.
Records of Center for New Words, 1976-2010: A Finding Aid. Schlesinger Library, Radcliffe Institute, Harvard University.

Northwestern University alumni
American LGBT rights activists
1945 births
2015 deaths
Inductees of the Chicago LGBT Hall of Fame
American women political scientists